Nagarkurnool Assembly constituency is a constituency of Telangana Legislative Assembly, India. It is one of 4 constituencies in Nagarkurnool district. It is part of Nagarkurnool Lok Sabha constituency.

Marri Janardhan Reddy of Telangana Rashtra Samithi won the seat in 2014 Legislative Assembly Election.

Mandals
The Assembly Constituency presently comprises the following Mandals:

Members of Legislative Assembly

Election results

Telangana Legislative Assembly election, 2018

Telangana Legislative Assembly election, 2014

See also
 List of constituencies of Telangana Legislative Assembly

References

Assembly constituencies of Telangana
Mahbubnagar district